Narayangarh Assembly constituency is an assembly constituency in Paschim Medinipur district in the Indian state of West Bengal.

Overview
As per orders of the Delimitation Commission, No. 225 Narayangarh Assembly constituency is composed of the following: Narayangarh community development block.

Narayangarh Assembly constituency is part of No. 34 Medinipur (Lok Sabha constituency).

Members of Legislative Assembly

Election results

2021

2016
In the 2016 elections, Prodyut Kumar Ghosh of Trinamool Congress defeated his nearest rival Dr. Surjya Kanta Mishra of CPI(M).

2011
In the 2011 elections, Dr. Surjya Kanta Mishra of CPI(M) defeated his nearest rival Surjya Kanta Atta of Trinamool Congress.

  

.# Swing calculated on Congress+Trinamool Congress vote percentages taken together in 2006.

2006
In the 2006 elections, Dr. Surjya Kanta Mishra of CPI(M) defeated his nearest rival Salil Kumar Das Pattanayak of Trinamool Congress.

  

.# Swing calculated on Trinamool Congress+BJP vote percentages taken together in 2006.

2001
In the 2001 elections, Dr. Surjya Kanta Mishra of CPI(M) defeated his nearest rival Salil Kumar Das Pattanayak of Trinamool Congress.

  

.# Swing calculated on Congress+Trinamool Congress vote percentages taken together in 2001.

1996
In the 1996 elections, Dr. Surjya Kanta Mishra of CPI(M) defeated his nearest rival Salil Kumar Das Pattanayak of Congress.

1991
In the 1991 elections, Dr. Surjya Kanta Mishra of CPI(M) defeated his nearest rival Salil Kumar Das Pattanayak of Congress.

1977-2006
In 2006, 2001, 1996 and 1991 state assembly elections, Surjya Kanta Mishra of CPI(M) won the Narayangarh assembly seat defeating Salil Kumar Das Pattanayak of Trinamool Congress in 2006 and 2001, Durgesh Mishra of Congress in 1996 and Salil Kumar Das Pattanayak of Congress in 1991. Contests in most years were multi cornered but only winners and runners are being mentioned. Bibhuti Bhusan De of CPI(M) defeated Timir Baran Pahari of Congress in 1987 and Krishna Das Roy of Congress in 1982. Krishna Das Roy of Congress defeated Mihir Kumar Laha of Janata Party in 1977.

1951-1972
Braja Kishore Maity of Congress won in 1972 and 1971. Mihir Kumar Laha of Bangla Congress won in 1969. K.D.Roy of Congress won in 1967. Krishna Prasad Mondal of Congress won in 1962. The Narayanagarh seat was not there in 1957. In independent India's first election in 1951, Surendranath Pramanik of KMPP and Krishna Chandra Satpati of BJS won the Narayangarh dual seat.

References

Assembly constituencies of West Bengal
Politics of Paschim Medinipur district